= Chayilung Monastery =

Monastery in Qinghai, People's Republic of China

Religion
- Affiliation: Tibetan Buddhism

Location
- Location: Qinghai, China
- Country: India

Chayilung Monastery is a Buddhist monastery in Qinghai, China.
